Bullers Wood School is a comprehensive girls’ school with a mixed Sixth Form academy school located on St Nicolas Lane in Chislehurst, part of the London Borough of Bromley. It is a member of the Bullers Wood Multi Academy Trust, along with Bullers Wood School for Boys.

Admissions
The school accepts girls only until the Sixth Form, when boys are admitted. As of 2021, enrollment included 1514 girls and 59 boys. The school's motto is Quod Potes Tenta, which is translated, "Strive To Your Utmost". It is situated just north of Chislehurst Road (B264), halfway (east-west) between Bromley and Chislehurst.

History
Bullers Wood facilities are a combination of several refurbished historical houses and modern additions. Named after an ancient forest, the original Bullers Wood house was built in the 1860s and was owned by the Sanderson family from the 1870s. Scotsman John Sanderson, who had made his money sheep farming in Australia, employed local architect Ernest Newton (1856–1922) to extend the house in 1889.

County council control
From 1929 to 1939, the site hosted Sir Sydney Nicholson's  Royal School of Church Music, with the school's chapel being the present library. At the beginning of the second World War, the site was bought by Kent County Council and used by the Auxiliary Fire Service.

Technical and grammar school
During the Second World War it was transformed into a secondary school. A V-1 flying bomb hit the Bromley Day Commercial School for Girls on Wharton Street in Bromley, so it moved to the Bullers Wood site. It became Bromley Girls' Technical High School for ages 14–17, and after buildings were added, it became Bromley Technical High School for Girls for ages 11–18. It was known as Bromley Technical School for Girls by 1958, before becoming Bromley Technical High School for Girls.

In 1968, it became a grammar school as Bullers Wood School under Kent Education Committee.

Comprehensive
In April 1974 it came under Bromley borough control. It became a grant-maintained school in 1991. In 1990 it had around 1000 girls. In 1991, after raising money from parents, it bought the £65,000 La Serronnerie study centre in deepest Normandy, which was used for week-long visits via Dieppe. The head teacher at the time was Barbara Vanderstock. The house had room for 14 girls at a time.

Academy
On 1 May 2011, Bullers Wood School gained academy status, marking the end of its control by Bromley borough.

In 2015, Bullers Wood made plans to open a boys' school to accommodate 900 pupils in Bromley. Bullers Wood Boys School had been approved in 2018 by the Bromley council, but the council reversed its decision after reconsidering the impact it would have on traffic. Bullers Wood School for Boys did open in September 2018, with plans to complete a main school building at Chislehurst Road in 2021.

Achievements
In 2011 Ofsted described the school as "outstanding", and noted that it held Healthy Schools, Artsmark Gold and Consultant School accreditation.

Facilities and involvement in the community
The school's grounds cover 22 acres. A sports field with a pavilion is approximately a quarter mile from the school grounds, and a netball court is next to the school pond, as well as a gym, a sports hall, an assembly hall.

Sixth form
The school has a mixed sixth form open to both Bullers' girls and external students. The sixth-form centre is based in Inglewood. Here students have access to a kitchen with cooking appliances and computer rooms. Common rooms are available for both Year 12 and 13 students and a media suite can be found in the attic.

Notable former pupils
 Ruthie Henshall, theatre actress
 Zoe Tapper. actress
 Theresa Lola. Writer

References

External links
  (video, 3:13 minutes)
 EduBase

Girls' schools in London
Academies in the London Borough of Bromley
Educational institutions established in the 1940s
Secondary schools in the London Borough of Bromley
1940s establishments in England
Chislehurst